Cape Town in South Africa has had a long history of hosting major sporting events.

References

 
Sport events
Cape Town events
Cape Town
Sports events in Cape Town